EA-1763, O-PPVX, V1 or propyl S-2-diisopropylaminoethylmethylphosphonothiolate, is a military-grade neurotoxic organophosphonate nerve agent related to VX. It is part of the V-series. The substitution of a proton for methyl makes its properties more similar to those of VX.

Chemical characteristics 
The effects of the propyl group are based on the effects of propyl/ethyl acetate on VX.  Little information about EA-1763's physicochemical properties has been reported. V1 is a more viscous and less dense liquid than VX. It is colorless, odorless and tasteless in its pure form. Impure, or in the crude form, it has a characteristic viscous amber color, giving it an appearance similar to motor oil. The impure form varies several shades of amber, from a viscous liquid of a transparent pale yellow color to a pasty liquid of a semi-transparent and cloudy dirty amber color. The smell varies from engine oil to an offensive brew of organosulfur compounds and organoamines.

V1 has a boiling point of 316,5 degrees C. Its larger paraffin chain pushes its melting point above that of VX. The estimated solubility of V1 in water is 4 times lower compared to VX (6.8 g/L of water at 25°C). V1 has high solubility in organic solvents and other non-polar compounds. The stability of V1 is considerably the same as that of VX in either environment. Higher insolubility and lower volatility can slow down the process. A vapor pressure at least 3 times lower than VX is speculated.

A methyl group on the β-carbon adjacent to the O-bonded α-carbon tends to stabilize the induction of electrons from P to O, making P less electrophilic. It is expected that the persistence of V1 is slightly higher than that of VX, estimating the hydrolysis rate between ethyl and n-propyl paraoxon, is 1.6 times more persistent in neutral medium.

The lower volatility and minimal persistence difference makes VX preferable to V1.

Preparation 
The manufacture of S-(2-dialkylaminoethyl) O-alkyl alkylphosphonothiolates essentially involves the conditions reported by Eckhaus et al.

Reference 

V-series nerve agents
Phosphonothioates
Chemical weapons of the United States
Diisopropylamino compounds